Meydavud-e Sofla (also Romanized as Meydāvūd-e Soflá and Meidavood Sofla; also known as Mai Dāūd Pāīn, Meydāvūd-e Pā’īn, and Meydāvūd Pā’īn) is a village in Meydavud Rural District, Meydavud District, Bagh-e Malek County, Khuzestan Province, Iran. At the 2006 census, its population was 2,331, in 468 families.

References 

Populated places in Bagh-e Malek County